Diyanet (a Turkish word for office or authority for Islamic religious affairs) may refer to: 

 Presidency of Religious Affairs (Diyanet İşleri Başkanlığı)
 Turkish-Islamic Union for Religious Affairs (Diyanet İşleri Türk İslam Birliği) - a German branch of the Presidency of Religious Affairs

See also
 Islam in Germany
 Islam in Turkey